Volkan Yaman (born 23 October 1997), known professionally as Apache 207, is a German rapper from Ludwigshafen. He became best known for his breakthrough hit "Roller" in August 2019, which would be the first of several more Top 10 hits.

Life and career
Apache 207 has Turkish roots. He finished high school in 2017 with A-Levels  in Ludwigshafen.
The rapper started his mainstream career in June 2018 when he released his debut single "Kleine Hure" still without label support. The song was followed up by seven other singles, released over the course of six months. In early 2019, he was signed to musician Bausa's label TwoSides. The first single to be released under the label was "Kein Problem" in April 2019. Initially, the song garnered little attention and did not peak in Germany until late October 2019, at 17. However, the song's music video reached over eight million clicks on YouTube in the following months. In May 2019, he earned his first chart entry in Germany with the release "Brot nach Hause". Even though the single "2 Minuten" climbed up to 35 in Germany, his chart success remained moderate. On 23 August 2019, he released "Roller" which would debut at number two. In the following week, it reached number one on the chart. In Austria and Switzerland, the song peaked within the Top 10. His follow-up releases "200 km/h" and "2002" with Sido became Top 10 hits as well. He achieved his second number one in Germany with the single "Wieso tust du dir das an?" in October 2019. His first EP Platte was released on 25 October 2019.

Discography

Albums

EPs

Singles

As lead artist

As featured artist

Other charted songs

Awards and nominations

Results

References

1997 births
German rappers
Living people
German people of Turkish descent
People from Ludwigshafen